Splicing factor, arginine/serine-rich 4 is a protein that in humans is encoded by the SFRS4 gene.

Interactions
SFRS4 has been shown to interact with Pinin.

References

Further reading